Radio-controlled cars (or RC cars  for short) are miniature model cars, vans, buses, trucks or buggies that can be controlled from a distance using a specialized transmitter or remote. The term "RC" has been used to mean both "remote controlled" and "radio controlled"." remote controlled" includes vehicles that are controlled by radio waves, infrared waves or a physical wire connection, but the latter term is now obsolete. A common use of "RC" today usually refers only to vehicles controlled by radio, and this article focuses on radio-controlled vehicles only.

Cars are powered by various sources. Electric models are powered by small but powerful electric motors and rechargeable nickel-cadmium, nickel metal hydride, or lithium polymer cells. There are also brushed or brushless electric motors - brushless motors are more powerful and efficient, but also much more expensive than brushed motors. Most fuel-powered models use glow plug engines, small internal combustion engines fueled by a special mixture of nitromethane, methanol, and oil (in most cases a blend of castor oil and synthetic oil). These are referred to as "nitro" cars. Recently, exceptionally large models have been introduced that are powered by small gasoline engines, similar to string trimmer motors, which use a mix of oil and gasoline. Electric cars are generally considered easier to work with compared to fuel-driven models but can be equally as complex at the higher budget and skill levels. Both electric and nitro models can be very fast, although electric is easier to upgrade and more versatile.

In both of these categories, both on-road and off-road vehicles are available. Off-road models, which are built with fully functional off-road suspensions and a wide tire selection, can be used on various types of terrain. On-road cars, with a much less robust suspension, are limited to smooth, paved surfaces. There are also rally cars, which fall somewhere between on-road and off-road and can be driven on gravel, dirt or other loose surfaces. In the past decade, advances in "on-road" vehicles have made their suspension as adjustable as many full scale race cars, today.

Toy-grade RC cars

Toy-grade RC cars are typically manufactured with a focus on design coupled with reducing production costs. Whereas a hobby-grade car has separate electronic components that are individually replaceable if they fail, toy-grade cars are typically made with cheaper components that are harder to find as spare parts, and a single electronic circuit board is integrated into the design of the vehicle.

Although hobby-grade enthusiasts may look down on toy-grade RC cars, their maintenance is much easier than that of hobby-grade models since the number of components is drastically smaller, and parts can be harvested at almost no cost from any RC toy car of a similar size. Performance is generally much less than hobby-grade cars but can be upgraded by adding hobby-grade parts. Stock toy-grade cars are equipped with weaker motors and are powered by alkaline or NiCad batteries, which means their top speed is usually only . Cheaper ones lack any form of a suspension and the ones that do feature a suspension that has very primitive or rudimentary designs. Steering typically lacks proportional control (with only three positions: straight, full left, and full right) and there is typically no proportional "throttle" either, with stopped and full power usually being the only options. Most toy-grade cars are primarily marketed toward children, although some older enthusiasts enjoy tinkering with them and improving them. Many toy-grade cars also have highly detailed scale body shells, which are often adapted for use on hobby-grade vehicles to give them a more scale appearance. However, you can get hold of larger more powerful real-looking RC cars but they are not exactly "toy-grade".

Many hobby-grade enthuthe siasts began their fascination with radio controlled models starting with Toy-Grade models during the 'Golden Age of Toy RC' from the late 1980s - early 1990s when the companies Taiyo Kogyo Co. Ltd (Japan) and Tyco Toys (USA) dominated the market and became household names, with their products starring in TV shows, Hollywood movies, and featured under Christmas trees worldwide just as often as the leading Sega and Nintendo game consoles of that era. It was during this time that some of the most popular radio controlled toys ever made were manufactured, beginning with the 1986 Taiyo Jet Hopper (Japan, Europe, Australia), later sold as the Tyco 9.6V Turbo Hopper (in the United States), followed by the Typhoon Hovercraft, the Fast Traxx, the Scorcher 6x6, the Bandit, and the Eliminator to name just a few. The designs for many of these toys can be traced back to only a few inventors, namely Shohei Suto (owner of now defunct Taiyo Kogyo Co. Ltd.) who was responsible for many of the early Taiyo cars such as the Jet Hopper, and who contributed together with Neil Tilbor, and Michael G. Hetman (inventors at Tyco) to the Bandit, Eliminator, Fast Traxx, Typhoon, Mutator 4WD, Scorcher, and Python.

Hobby-grade radio control models

In past several years, hobby-grade "ready-to-run" (or "RTR") models have become readily available from major manufacturers of radio-controlled cars, attracting many hobbyists who would otherwise not have purchased a kit car. Vehicles of this type need little or no final assembly and in most cases, the bodies are shipped painted and trimmed. Safety inspection of the product to ensure correct operation is essential, as injury to operators or bystanders from disassembling vehicles is possible. A number of cars and trucks are presently available only in ready-to-run form. The growing popularity of the RTR vehicle has prompted many manufacturers to discontinue production of kit vehicles. High-spec racing vehicles are generally still available or sold only as kits, and companies like Thunder Tiger, Losi, HPI, Traxxas and Tamiya sell kit and RTR versions with the benefits of a kit version being in upgraded parts or lower costs, respectively. Hobby grade vehicles can cost much more, ranging from US$90 to over US$2000.

Ready-to-run
As the name suggests, are pre-assembled models ready for immediate use. There are versions that run on both batteries and nitro.

Kits

Kit vehicles are sold as a box of individual parts, and must be assembled before driving. Although they require more skill to get running than an RTR vehicle, a relatively easy kit (such as those from Tamiya) is a good way to learn more about working on RC cars. Many kits are very easily modified with a wide variety of available parts. There are also "ARTR" or Almost Ready To Run models, which come mostly assembled but require a small amount of extra work before running. Most ARTR's only require electronics that are distributed by other brands.

Electric models

Electrically powered models utilize mechanical speed controllers (MSC's) or electronic speed controllers (ESC's) to adjust the amount of power delivered to the electric motor. The power delivered is proportional to the amount of throttle called for by the transmitter - the more the trigger is pulled, the faster it goes. The voltage is "pulsed" using pulse-width modulation to produce varying output with smooth transitions and greater efficiency. Electronic speed controllers use solid state components that regulate the duty cycle, adjusting the power delivered to the electrical motor. In addition, most electronic speed controllers can use the electric motor as a magnetic brake, offering better control of the model than is possible with a mechanical speed control.

Mechanical speed controllers use a network of resistors and switch between them by rotating a head with an electrode around a plate that has electrical contacts. Mechanical speed controllers are prone to being slow to react because they are actuated by servos, waste energy in the form of heat from the resistors, commonly become dirty and perform intermittently, and lack a dedicated braking ability. They appear only in vintage RC models, and are now essentially obsolete.

Most electric cars up to recently used brushed motors but now many people are turning to brushless motors for their higher power output and because they require much less maintenance. They are rated either in relative turns or Kv. The Kv number tells how many RPM the motor will turn per volt. However, the ability of the system to put out power is dependent on the quality of the batteries used, wires and connectors supplying power. Due to their power, brushless motors are also used in bigger monster trucks and 1/8 nitro-powered buggies that have been converted to electric. High quality brushless systems can be much more powerful than nitro and can accomplish feats such as standing backflips when installed in a monster truck, most notably the HPI Savage Flux. Some 1/5 scale gas to electric conversions are in production but are uncommon due to high price.

A new form of electric RC racing was introduced in an August 3, 2008 YouTube video by Wes Raynor of England, he called the new hobby 'MAGracing'. Cars are primarily 1/32 scale with some 1/24 scale. They are powered by rechargeable batteries, speed is controlled by RC. A magnet linked to the steering follows one of multiple steel wires buried just below the track surface enabling more accurate steering than is attainable with free running RC cars. An RC steering override allows cars to change lanes at specific places for following the 'racing line' and to pass a slower car. Tracks can therefore be much narrower and smaller making the system suitable for 'in home' racing. Cars can be driven back onto the track after
an 'off', using reverse if necessary, so that track marshals are not required.

Nitro powered models

Nitromethane nitro powered models utilize a single servo for throttle and braking control; rotation of the servo in one direction will cause the throttle on the carburetor to open, providing more air and fuel mixture to the internal combustion engine. Rotation of the servo in the other direction causes torque to be applied to a linkage and cam which causes friction with the braking material. The brake is commonly located on the driveshaft or spur gear in some cases and applies stopping power only to the driven wheels. Some models will also use an additional servo to control a transmission box, enabling the vehicle to drive in reverse.

This is due to restrictions by the main sanctioning bodies for radio-controlled racing. Many "outlaw" engines are manufactured larger than these, mainly intended for vehicles which will not be used in sanctioned races and therefore do not need to comply with these regulations. Engine size is related to the class of car; 1/10 scale on and off-road vehicles usually are equipped with .12–.18 cubic inch engines, with 1/8 scale vehicles using .21–.32 cubic inch engines. There are exceptions, with many Schumacher and Thunder Tiger/Team Associated RC models being good examples of unusually large engines coming as standard equipment on certain models.

Fuel-powered engines allow model cars to reach moderate speeds unmodified. Maximum power is generally achieved at medium to high speeds, and a slightly slower throttle response than electrically powered vehicles is to be expected due to clutching and lack of torque. Electric motors effectively produce instantaneous torque, whereas nitro engines, like full-sized gasoline engines, take time for the engine to spool up and for the clutch to engage. Nitro- (and fuel) powered cars may be refueled and returned to action in a few seconds, as opposed to electrics which require removal of the body shell and battery fasteners to replace a discharged battery. Nitro cars are cooled some by air, some by the oil mixed in with the fuel and may be run continuously with no need to take breaks for cooling down assuming they are properly tuned.

Nitro-powered cars operate like full-sized fuel vehicles more than their electric counterparts do, making use of a two stroke engine rather than an electric motor. The sound of the engine noise is a main selling points to nitro enthusiasts, even though brushless electric equivalents are generally faster and do not require special fuel. However, their exhaust contains unburned oil, which usually ends up coating the chassis. This, in turn, requires more cleaning than an electric-powered equivalent. Cleaning is usually achieved by the use of compressed air nozzles and solvents (such as denatured alcohol). Tuning a fuel-powered vehicle requires learning to maintain optimum performance and fuel economy, and to minimize engine wear and overheating, even in ready-to-run vehicles. Running a nitro-fuel motor without tuning or tuning improperly can hurt performance in rich conditions, and cause severe damage in lean conditions.

Because of their ability to be driven for longer periods of time and the use of burning fuel, mechanical wear in nitro vehicles is generally greater than in electric vehicles. In addition, the increased weight of fuel-powered vehicles generally lead to higher speed collisions, causing greater damage to the collided vehicles, and a greater degree of safety concerns needs to be taken into account. Maintenance such as cleaning of the air filter and general chassis cleaning, replacement of worn clutch parts, proper after-run lubrication (necessary for storage) and maintenance of other motor-related items such as glow plug replacement makes for a more frustrating experience for first time RC users. In addition, nitro motors typically require rebuilding or replacement after 2–8 gallons (7–30 liters) of fuel run through them, due to loss of compression, which can be accelerated by poor tuning and overheating. It is also possible to seriously damage the engines by over-revving them with no load or ingestion of dirt into the carburetor. As such, nitro-powered vehicles are by nature expensive to maintain.

Gasoline-powered models
Gasoline-powered vehicles, also known as "fuelies" or "gassers", run on a mix of gasoline and oil. They cost much more (usually US$800–US$3000 RTR) than nitro and electric cars. They are also much bigger, usually scale 1/6 or 1/5 usually referred to as Large Scale, and therefore require much more space to run. They do not usually have as high top-end speeds (compared to nitro and some electrics) but have much power and do not require much fuel to run. Over time the cost of a gas-powered car can be less than some nitro-powered vehicles, because of the high cost of nitro fuel and buying new nitro engines to replace worn-out ones. In addition, gas-powered motors rarely if ever require tuning and have a very long lifespan. These gas-powered vehicles really pertain to the individual who is more interested in scale than imagination. These large-scale models have been popular in Europe for over a decade with brands like FG Modelsport, MCD, Elcon, N-R-P and have become popular in the US thanks to companies like HPI Racing and Losi producing affordable high-quality models locally. In Europe there are sanctioned EFRA races that compete both in on-road cars as well as off-road cars to determine National Champions as well as European Champions, in the US ROAR has yet not picked up these as official classes.

Accessories and Upgrades
Most RC models generally require the purchase of additional accessories. For electrical vehicles, battery packs and a suitable charger are needed to power the car and are seldom included. A soldering iron and supplies are often necessary to build high-performance battery packs or install upgraded electronics with low-resistance connectors. A Li-Polymer battery with a hard case is popular for RC cars, with the most common voltages being 7.4 V or 11.1 V. LiPo batteries are known to be explosive if mistreated, so some enthusiasts still use NiMH batteries instead, which are less powerful but safer. For nitro-powered vehicles, a glow plug heater and fuel are needed to start the engine, as well as 4 AA size batteries, or a rechargeable six-volt, five-cell battery pack to power the on-board electronics. Nitro vehicles also require a means of cranking the engine over, which can be achieved using a pull-start, starter box, battery operated rotostart, or by an electric drill. The Traxxas nitro rc cars come with a hand start up system, that revs the engine and starts it up. It doesn't require a pull start system. Relatively expensive model fuel, spare glow-plugs, and after-run oil are also needed. Gasoline-powered vehicles require only a receiver battery pack and a means to start the engine, usually the included pull-start. Hobby-grade vehicles almost always require 8 AA size batteries to power the transmitter, though some can use rechargeable transmitter pack or simply rechargeable AAs.

A large industry of aftermarket manufacturers produce upgrade or hop-up parts for hobby-grade cars. Upgrades range from mere improvements to the longevity of R/C car parts, to all-out performance enhancements. Some hobbyists create their own upgrades for sale via classifieds and online forums. Hobbyists choose to upgrade hobby-grade cars from plastic stock parts to aluminum parts to increase strength and the steering angle of the car.

Principle of operation

Radio-controlled cars use a common set of components for their control and operation. All cars require a transmitter, which has the joysticks for control, or in pistol grip form, a trigger for throttle and a wheel for turning, and a receiver which sits inside the car. The receiver changes the radio signal broadcast from the transmitter into suitable electrical control signals for the other components of the control system. Most radio systems utilize amplitude modulation for the radio signal and encode the control positions with pulse-width modulation. Upgraded radio systems are available that use the more robust frequency modulation and pulse-code modulation. Recently however, 2.4 GHz frequency radios have become the standard for hobby-grade R/C cars. The radio is wired up to either electronic speed controls or servomechanisms (shortened to "servo" in common usage) which perform actions such as throttle control, braking, steering, and on some cars, engaging either forward or reverse gears. Electronic speed controls and servos are commanded by the receiver through pulse-width modulation; pulse duration sets either the amount of current that an electronic speed control allows to flow into the electric motor or sets the angle of the servo. On these models the servo is attached to at least the steering mechanism; rotation of the servo is mechanically changed into a force which steers the wheels on the model, generally through adjustable turnbuckle linkages. Servo savers are integrated into all steering linkages and some nitro throttle linkages. A servo saver is a flexible link between the servo and its linkage that protects the servo's internal gears from damage during impacts or stress.

History

Early experiments
The 1960s saw rapid developments in electronics and rechargeable batteries, leading to a variety of radio-controlled car experiments such as -

- Early 1960's Bill Johnson Experimental Car - In an article in the first issue (September 1970) of ‘Pit Stop’ magazine, Bill Johnson of Burbank, California is credited with building “in the early 1960’s”, an internal combustion engine-powered, radio-controlled, 1:12th scale, model car. The date is not specific, but it seems reasonable that “the early ‘60’s” would mean the car was built around 1963 or earlier.

It was described as an all metal, radio-controlled race car using an early Bonner reed radio control system. The car was composed of two sections, in the forward section the radio, power pack, two servos, and front suspension; the rear section contained the motor, rear end, rear suspension and the fuel tank.

A Veco .19 engine was chosen for its ability to deliver power at any given RPM. Bill experimented with a 4:1 direct drive gear ratio and finally settled on a 6:1 ratio. Using -inch diameter rear tires, Bill achieved a 600 to 2,500 RPM range resulting in speeds from 6 miles per hour to 29 miles per hour.

His independent front suspension, while not having adjustable camber, caster or other adjustments, and although on the heavy side by later standards, proved quite durable. The car tracked well in a straight line or in circles as small as 8 feet in diameter. Bill utilized a leaf spring front set-up to reduce jolts on rough surfaces. He had tried a worm drive to eliminate the jolts to the steering servo but that proved impractical.

For the rear suspension Johnson also used leaf springs because of the ease of installation in the car and to facilitate the changes that he anticipated as the car design evolved. Working alone, Bill achieved a remarkable degree of success and sophistication with a model car that was, quite possibly, the first functioning RC car, more remarkable because it was built from scratch, since no RC car parts were yet available.

- 1964 Ken Balz Experimental Car - Ken built an electric-powered, radio-controlled model car which combined a Monogram 1:8 scale Big “T” plastic model car kit with an Orbit 4-channel radio transmitter and receiver. Two “Micro Mo” motors with 485-to-1 gear reduction were used, one for steering and one to power the car. Rechargeable nickel-cadmium batteries supplied the energy. Steering was proportional but required two channels, one for left turns and one for right turns. Drive was not proportional but was single speed, radio-controlled “forward-stop-reverse-stop” sequence switch.

- 1965 Chuck Eckles Experimental Car – (Chuck was erroneously called Bill Eccles in one article) Chuck's car was a 1:11 scale, internal combustion, radio-controlled car with a stainless-steel chassis. His first clutch was designed to engage and turn the engine to start it and then disengage so that the engine could idle. It would then re-engage centrifugally as the engine speed was increased. He finally developed a simplified centrifugal clutch more like current designs. Two servos were used, the forward servo being used for steering, while the rear servo for both brake and throttle. The Mustang's rear axle ratio was 12:56 with a 56-tooth gear that was as large as space and ground clearance would permit. Wheels and tires used were semi-pneumatic, -inch Veco aircraft wheels.

After several experiments, the engine used was a Cox Medallion .15 with part of the throttle control used as a collector ring for exhaust and excess oil. The carburetor spray bar had been reworked to give a better idle, while an adjustable stop was installed. The top speed achieved was 35 mph.

Steering was rack and pinion with an independent front suspension. The overall length of this pioneering vehicle was -inch with a height of -inch, a width of -inch and an all-up weight of 3 ½ pounds. The 1965 Mustang body was .060 butyrate-acetate which was vacuum formed over a plaster model.

Early commercial products
Toy companies had been selling various motorized models for many years but interest in commercial production of radio-controlled model cars followed an interesting evolution in the United States.

- 1966 Wen-Mac/Testors Mustang - In the early ‘50’s, toy company Wen-Mac produced a cast aluminum, .049 gas engine powered Indy tether car, the Wen-Mac Automite. By the ‘60’s they were producing plastic, gas-powered tether cars. Then, in the November 19, 1965 issue of Life magazine, Ford Motor Company advertised an exclusive – “Only at Your Ford Dealers” - 16-inch, 1966 Poppy Red Motorized Mustang GT made by Wen-Mac. The price was $4.95. The ad showed a young boy playing with it indoors to show that it had a battery powered electric motor. However, the ad also noted, “For racing buffs a conversion kit (gasoline engine and slicks) and remote-control throttle may also be ordered.” The conversion kit also included a pylon and spikes for attaching the pylon to an outdoor racing surface and a line to tether the car. The revolutionary advancement was the “remote control throttle” (not radio control). This consisted of a second line fed from the car, through the pylon and back to the “driver” to control the throttle of the .049 cubic inch, two-stroke gas engine. Remote control by radio was the next step.

Apparently that next step was being developed during late 1965 and early 1966. Wen-Mac was purchased by Testors in 1966 and, in the April 1966 issue of Car Model magazine, coverage of the February 1966 Hobby Industry Trade show in Chicago included the Testors model company announcement of a radio-controlled, electric powered version of what was apparently the same basic 16” 1966 Mustang GT. It was mistakenly called a 1:9 scale model when actually, a 16" long 1966 Mustang is 1:11 scale.

It was powered by electric motors and had rechargeable nickel cadmium batteries. To operate the car, a switch on the bottom of the chassis was first set to select Low Speed or High Speed. The transmitter had 3 channels, one connected to a pushbutton that transmitted a simple “Go or Stop” signal to the drive motors. The other two channels were very early proportional controls, activated by a single stick; pushing it right activated the right turn channel and left for the left steering channel. The innovative drive system had two transverse motors, one for the right rear wheel and one for the left. Both motors powered the car when operated in a straight line but in a turn, the inside free-wheeled, creating a form of rear differential. Three different 27mHz channels were available to allow running 3 cars at a time. The price announced in 1966 for the complete, ready to run car was $69.95, a clear indication of the high price of radio control in what was originally a $4.95 battery electric car without radio control.

Another commercially viable RC car was available by mid-1966, produced by the Italian company El-Gi (Elettronica Giocattoli) from Reggio Emilia. Their first model, an electric 1:12 Ferrari 250 LM had an on-off motor control with no reverse. Steering had two on-off switches, turn radius was determined by how long the operator held down the appropriate left or right switch. An extensive article about the car and its driving characteristics appeared in the June 1966 Italian magazine Quattroruote.

Concerning viable 1:8 scale race cars, information received in an email from Mardave founder Wes Raynor: "When I started Mardave R/C Racing (in Leicester, England) in 1969/70 (not too sure which!) we claimed to be the first r/c (racing) car manufacturers in Europe. These cars were 1/8 scale, (proportional radio) I.C. engine powered cars."

In the early 1970s, several commercial products were created by small firms in the US. Most of these companies began as slot car companies and with the wane in popularity of that genre moved into the R/C field. Among these were Associated Electrics, Thorp, Dynamic, Taurus, Delta, and Scorpion. These primarily were 1/8 scale nitro-powered (then called gas) aluminum flat pan cars generally powered by a .21 cubic inch engine. The bodies for these cars were vacuum formed polycarbonate (the most popular made of Lexan). The most popular engine was the K&B Veco McCoy. The primary sanctioning body for races for these cars was Remotely Operated Auto Racers (ROAR). In 1973–74, Jerobee, a company based in Washington State, created their 1/12 nitro car using a Cox .049 engine. Over 54,000 were sold "Ready to Run" W/Radio control system of which 25K were made by EK Product od Texas and the balance by JoMac when they bought the company from Rocket Research Corp. Several aftermarket companies created parts for this car including clear Lexan bodies, heat sinks, and larger fuel tanks. This scale evolved into 1/12 scale electric racing when Associated Electrics created the RC12E in 1976–77. Jerobee became Jomac and created their own electric kit called the Lightning 2000 that won the "ROAR" National Championships in 1981& 82 for 6-Cell Modified and 82 the 6-Cell Production classes. The Lightning 2000 was designed by Don McKay and Jon Congdon.

By the late 1970s, interests in 1/12 scale electric racing began to grow as 1/8 scale IC racers, the sole racing category at the time, needing to race throughout the winter as an alternative to their impractical IC cars began to race 1/12 cars, therefore a winter national series was developed. As a result, the series grew into popularity as a large number of scratch-built cars started to appear in these meetings. Again, electric r/c cars were enabled by one revolutionary development, that of the nicad rechargeable battery. Prior to the mid-1970s, batteries were either heavy lead acid or expensive throw away dry cells. In 1976, the Japanese firm Tamiya, which was renowned for their intricately detailed plastic model kits, released a series of elegant and highly detailed, but mechanically simple electric on-road car models that were sold as "suitable for radio control". Although rather expensive to purchase, the kits and radio systems sold rapidly. Tamiya soon began to produce more purpose-built remote-controlled model cars, and were the first to release off-road buggies featuring real suspension systems. It was this progression toward the off-road class that brought about much of the hobby's popularity, as it meant radio-controlled cars were no longer restricted to bitumen and smooth surfaces, but could be driven virtually anywhere. The first true Tamiya off-road vehicles were the Sand Scorcher and the Rough Rider, both released in 1979, and both based on realistic dune buggy designs. Tamiya continued to produce off-road vehicles in increasing numbers, featuring working suspensions, more powerful motors, textured off-road rubber tires and various stylized "dune buggy" bodies. They also produced trucks, such as the Toyota HiLux Pickup, that featured realistic three-speed gearboxes and leaf-spring suspension systems. All of these models were realistic, durable, easy to assemble, capable of being modified, and simple to repair. They were so popular that they could be credited with launching a boom in radio-controlled model cars in the early to mid 1980s, and provided the basis for today's radio-controlled car market. Popular Tamiya models included the Grasshopper and the Hornet dune buggies as well as the Blackfoot and Clodbuster monster truck models. The earliest Tamiya models, particularly the early off roaders, are now highly sought after by vintage R/C collectors and can fetch prices of up to US$3000 on internet auction sites if still in mint, unbuilt form. Acknowledging their continued popularity, several of the early kits have even been re-released by Tamiya during 2005–2007, with a few alterations.

A British firm, Schumacher Racing, was the first to develop an adjustable ball differential in 1980, which allowed nearly infinite tuning for various track conditions. At the time the majority of on-road cars had a solid axle, while off-road cars generally had a gear-type differential. Team Associated followed suit with the introduction of the RC100 1/8 scale gas on-road car, RC12 1/12 scale on-road electric car, and RC10 1/10 scale off-road electric racing buggy in 1984 (see below). Team Losi followed with the introduction of the JRX2 in 1988.

Modern developments in radio controlled racing

In 1984, Associated Electrics, Inc. of Costa Mesa, California introduced the RC10 off-road electric racer; this model was a departure from 'Associated Electrics' regular line of nitromethane-powered on-road race cars. Designed as a high-grade radio controlled car, the chassis of the RC10 buggy was manufactured from anodized, aircraft-grade aluminum alloy. The shock absorbers were machined, oil-filled and completely tuneable; they were also produced from the same aluminum alloy. Suspension control arms were manufactured from high-impact nylon, as were the three-piece wheels.

Optional metal shielded ball bearings were sometimes incorporated in RC10 wheels and transmissions. The RC10 transmission contained an innovative differential featuring hardened steel rings pressed against balls - which made it almost infinitely adjustable for any track condition. The RC10 quickly became the dominant model in electric off-road racing.

In 1986, Schumacher Racing Products released their CAT (Competition All Terrain) vehicle, widely considered the best four wheel drive off-road "buggy" racer of the time. The CAT went on to win the 1987 off-road world championship. This car is credited for sparking an interest in four-wheel-drive electric off-road racing.

Gil Losi Jr., whose family ran the "Ranch Pit Shop R/C" racetrack in Pomona, California, turned his college studies toward engineering, primarily in the field of injection molded plastics, leading to his foundation of Team Losi. When the JRX-2, the first Team Losi buggy, was released, it initiated a rivalry with Team Associated that continues to this day. Team Losi went on to secure a number of achievements, which included the industry's first all-natural rubber tires, the first American-made four-wheel-drive racing buggy, and an entirely new class of cars, the 1/18-scale Mini-T off-road electrics.

Although Losi and Associated seemed to dominate much of the American market, Traxxas, (another American company, famous for the X-Maxx and the Slash), and Kyosho (from Japan), were also making competitive two-wheel-drive off-road racing models. Although Losi and Associated were close rivals in the US, Schumacher off-road models continued to be popular amongst European hobbyists.

Electric and nitro cars have come a long way in terms of power. Electric cars have gone from non-rebuildable brushed motors and NiCad batteries to brushless motors and LiPo. Nitro cars have gone from small engines to huge .36-.80 engines that are used in big monster trucks.

The control systems for robotic cars have greatly evolved with the advances in internet communication systems. Attempts have been made to provide web protocol based control over robots.

Telemetry in RC racing
In the last few years, one-way telemetry systems have also been applied in RC racing cars to get information from the car's sensors like
 Engine/motor RPM
 Battery voltage 
 Engine/motor temperature

The telemetry system is usually integrated in car's receiver and transmitted to the controller.

See also
 International Federation of Model Auto Racing
 IFMAR 1:10 Electric Off-Road World Championship
 1:10 radio-controlled off-road buggy

References

 
Toy cars and trucks
Articles containing video clips